Serhiy Lezhentsev; Sergey Lezhentsev (born 4 August 1971) is a Ukrainian football coach and a former player.

Coaching career
On 6 October 2020, he was banned from football activity for one year by the Russian Football Union for fielding two unregistered players under false names in a game between the club he was managing, FC Tuapse and FC SKA Rostov-on-Don on 21 September 2020.

Personal life
In 2014, after the annexation of the Crimea to Russia, he acquired Russian citizenship as Sergey Lezhentsev. In 2018, he joined the Putin Team public movement.

References

External links 
 
 Profile at Odesskiy futbol portal

1971 births
Living people
Sportspeople from Simferopol
Ukrainian footballers
Ukraine international footballers
SC Tavriya Simferopol players
FC Okean Kerch players
FC Kremin Kremenchuk players
FC Nyva Ternopil players
FC Dynamo Kyiv players
FC Chornomorets Odesa players
FC Vorskla Poltava players
FC Metalist Kharkiv players
FC Kryvbas Kryvyi Rih players
FC Sevastopol players
Ukrainian Premier League players
Ukrainian football managers
FC Ihroservice Simferopol managers
Crimean Premier League managers

Association football defenders
Naturalised citizens of Russia
Russian football managers